Baschurch railway station was a minor station located about ten miles north of Shrewsbury on the GWR's Paddington to Birkenhead main line. Today this is part of the Shrewsbury to Chester line. The station building (now a private house) can be seen on the west side of the line adjacent Baschurch level crossing; it was designed by Thomas Mainwaring Penson.

Historical services
Express trains did not call at Baschurch, only local services.

According to the Official Handbook of Stations the following classes of traffic were being handled at this station in 1956: G, P, F, L, H & C and there was a three-ton crane.

Although the station was closed the line has continued in use for through trains.

Accidents and incidents
On 13 February 1961, an express passenger train was in collision with a freight train that was being shunted at the station. The accident was due to a signalman's error. Three people were killed and two were injured.

Campaign for reopening
In September 2009, a local group was formed to campaign for the station to be reopened. An initial public meeting was attended by 250 people, and Arriva Trains Wales the franchise operator for the line agreed to re-examine the feasibility of trains stopping at Baschurch.

As of October 2011 the campaign continued, with the commissioning of new research into the feasibility of the reopening proposal. Funding for the study was declined by Shropshire Council, but now campaigners are to fund it themselves.

See also
Listed buildings in Baschurch

References

Further reading

External links
 Baschurch station on navigable 1946 O.S. map
 Baschurch Station Group

Disused railway stations in Shropshire
Railway stations in Great Britain closed in 1960
Railway stations in Great Britain opened in 1848
Former Great Western Railway stations
Thomas Mainwaring Penson railway stations